The City of London Choir is a non-professional choir based in London, England. With about 100 active members, it performs regularly in some of the city’s principal concert venues, including the Barbican Centre, Cadogan Hall, Royal Albert Hall, Royal Festival Hall and St John's, Smith Square. In recent years the choir has made a number of recordings and performed music of the 16th to 21st centuries with the London Mozart Players, the Royal Philharmonic Orchestra and other ensembles.

History 

The City of London Choir started life as the Kingsway Choral Society, founded by Donald Cashmore. In 1963, it was renamed the City of London Choir and its inaugural concert under that name took place at the Church of the Holy Sepulchre in Holborn. The choir’s early patrons included Benjamin Britten, Sir George Dyson, Ursula Vaughan Williams and Kenneth Leighton. Donald Cashmore, the founding conductor, was succeeded by Hilary Davan Wetton in 1989, who continues to lead the choir to this day. Under his musical direction, the choir has developed a particularly strong reputation for English music of the twentieth century, but it has a broad repertoire.

The choir is a registered charity whose object is to nurture a love and understanding of music among its members and audiences, and is committed to creating opportunities for children and young people both to perform and to attend concerts, notably through its Young Singer Scheme, the Front Row Club, and the Young Apprentice Tenor Scheme which aims to foster and encourage new young choral tenors from London schools with bursaries. For more details on all these initiatives, please see the choir’s website. Besides concerts and recordings, the choir organises choral workshops and residential weekends which are open to members and non-members alike.

Recordings 

 The Nation's Favourite Carols, Classic FM, 2017
 Nelson Mass and Mass in Time of War (Haydn), RPO Records, 2016
 Flowers of the Field (Vaughan Williams, Fizni, Gurney, Butterworth), Naxos, 2014
 Cantata for Christmas (John Gardner), EM Records, 2012
 Der Glorreiche Augenblick (Beethoven). Naxos, 2012
 The Coming of Christ (Holst). EM Records, 2011
 In Terra Pax: A Christmas Anthology. Naxos, 2009

References 

 https://www.telegraph.co.uk/music/classical-music/summer-music-city-churches-beautiful-showcase-glories-capital/
 https://www.theguardian.com/music/2012/jun/07/beethoven-der-glorreiche-augenblick-review
 https://www.theguardian.com/music/2009/dec/04/finzi-in-terra-pax-holst-christmas-day

External links 

 The City of London Choir website

British classical music groups
London choirs